Koru Uppalapadu (or K.Uppalapadu) is a village in Kondapi mandal, located in Prakasam district of the Indian state of Andhra Pradesh. It belongs to Kandukur revenue division..

Demographics 

 census, the town had a population of 2,968. The total population constitute, 1,456 males and 1,512 females (sex ratio of 1038 females per 1000 males) and 219 children in the age group of 0–6 years. The average literacy rate stands at 70.14% with 1,928 literates, significantly higher than the state average of 67.41%. Nearby villages are Chodavaram, Venkanna Palem, Vennuru, Thumadu and Muppavaram.

Agriculture
Cash crops like tobacco, subabul, peanuts and food crops like Rice, and a variety of pulses are grown in this region. K. Uppalapadu is located in between (west of) Tanguturu and (east of) Kondapi towns.

Political 
K. Uppalapadu belongs to Kondapi Assembly constituency. It has also produced some eminent local political personalities like Gundapaneni Pattabhi Ramayya Chowdary, Gundapaneni Achuta Kumar.

K. Uppalapadu is a Village Panchayat administered / headed by Sarpanch, currently Vaka Koteswaramma is the Sarpanch of the village.

Education
Most of the Children in the Village are educated and the literacy rate is increasing drastically in this village. Also this village is well known for its education because of Paparao Public School, which is the only residential English medium school in Kondapi Mandal with good education standards.

Government Elementary School in the middle of the village
Government ZPP High school in the east side of the village
Paparao Public School in the west side of the village.

Transport
K. Uppalapadu is well connected by Road on all four sides. It is on the major road connecting Tanguturu (on NH5/AH45) to Kondapi. It is also connected directly to Ongole Via Nidamanuru & Kandukur via Vikkiralapeta (Village Dirt Road). Bus services of APSRTC from Ongole & Tanguturu. The village also has Indian Oil filling station on the West.

References

Villages in Prakasam district